Gayev (masculine) is a Russian surname formed from the Rome given name Gaius (with Greek origin) or from the Slavonic word gay meaning noise. Librarians often transliterate this name as Gaev. The feminine form of the surname is Gayeva or Gaeva. In particular this surname is spread out in the Perm Krai (Ural Federal District).

The surname is shared by:
  (1905–1974), Soviet scientist, one of the deputy directors of the Ioffe Institute
 Dmitry Gayev (1951–2012), Soviet railway engineer, long-term chief of the Moscow metro system
 Pavel Gayev (1901–1943), Soviet military intelligence officer, guards colonel, deputy commander of the 13th Guards Rifle Division
 Vladimir Gayev (born 1977), football player from Belarus, goalkeeper

References

Russian-language surnames